The 10th Annual Premios Juventud (Youth Awards) were broadcast by Univision on July 18, 2013.

Performers
 Abraham Mateo — "Señorita"
 Maite Perroni — "Tú Y Yo"
 Lucero — "No Pudiste Amar Así" 
 Ricky Martin — "Come With Me"
 Pitbull & Jennifer López — Medley: "On The Floor", "Don't Stop The Party", "Dance Again" And "Live It Up"
 Thalía — "Manías"
 J Álvarez — "La Pregunta"
 Jencarlos Canela — "I Love It"
 Marc Anthony — "Vivir Mi Vida"
 Eiza González & Marconi — "Me Puedes Pedir Lo Que Sea"
 El Dasa — "Mentirosa"
 Prince Royce — "Darte Un Beso"
 J Balvin — "Yo Te Lo Dije"
 Chino y Nacho — "Sin Ti"
 Pee Wee — "Duele Decirte Adiós"
 Víctor Manuelle — "Me Llamaré Tuyo"
 Yandel — "Hablé De Ti"

Winners and nominations
Bold denotes winner not revealed during the ceremony.

Special awards
Supernova: Eugenio Derbez
The Best Dressed Award: Marjorie De Sousa, Gerardo Ortíz
Icono Mundial: Jennifer Lopez

References

Premios Juventud
Premios
Premios
Premios
Premios
Premios Juventud
Premios Juventud
2010s in Miami